Partitioning Communication System is a computer and communications security architecture based on an information flow separation policy. The PCS extends the four foundational security policies of a MILS (Multiple Independent Levels of Security) software architecture to the network:

 End-to-end Information Flow
 End-to-end Data Isolation
 End-to-end Periods Processing
 End-to-end Damage Limitation

The PCS leverages software separation to enable application layer entities to enforce, manage, and control application layer security policies in such a manner that the application layer security policies are:

 Non-bypassable
 Evaluatable
 Always-invoked
 Tamper-proof

The result is a communications architecture that allows a software separation kernel and the PCS to share responsibility of security with the application.

The PCS was invented by OIS.  OIS collaborated extensively on the requirements for the PCS with:

 National Security Agency
 Air Force Research Laboratory
 University of Idaho
 Lockheed Martin
 Boeing
 Rockwell Collins

References

 
 Presentation at OMG Software Based Communications Workshop
 

Operating system security